The 2003 Swedish Rally (formally the 52nd Uddeholm Swedish Rally) was the second round of the 2003 World Rally Championship. The race was held over three days between 7 February and 9 February 2003, and was based in Karlstad, Sweden. Peugeot's Marcus Grönholm won the race, his 13th win in the World Rally Championship.

Background

Entry list

Itinerary
All dates and times are CET (UTC+1).

Results

Overall

World Rally Cars

Classification

Special stages

Championship standings

Production World Rally Championship

Classification

Special stages

Championship standings

References

External links 
 Official website of the World Rally Championship

Sweden
Swedish Rally
Rally